The trickle-up effect or trickle-up economics is an economic policy proposition that final demand among a broad population can stimulate national income in an economy. The trickle-up effect states that policies that directly benefit lower income individuals will boost the income of society as a whole, and thus those benefits will "trickle up" throughout the population.

Political terminology

Relationship to trickle-down economics

Trickle-down economics, as a term, is in much more frequent and broad use than "trickle-up". The term "trickle-down" is used by critics of economic policies to say that those policies favor wealthy individuals or large corporations over the middle and lower classes. In recent history, the term has been used broadly by critics of supply-side economics. Major US examples of what critics have called "trickle-down economics" include the Reagan tax cuts, the Bush tax cuts, and the Tax Cuts and Jobs Act of 2017. Major UK examples include the tax cut policies of Margaret Thatcher, the economic policies of Friedrich Hayek, and Liz Truss's mini-budget tax cuts of 2022.

To juxtapose competing economic and political ideas with so called "trickle down" policies, the terms trickle up and bottom up have been used. For example, the principle behind the Obama administration's actions was referred to as trickle-up economics, but the term bottom-up economics was also used. Biden's American Rescue Plan was also referred to as trickle up. Accompanying labeling differed from most trickle down labels in that both Obama's and Biden's approaches were characterized as spending heavy programs, rather than tax cuts in any particular tax bracket. At the same time, some criticisms of Obama's economic policy were labeled trickle up.

Application in policy 
The principle behind Obama administration's actions was referred to as trickle-up economics, but the term bottom-up economics was also used for it. On February 17, 2009, President Obama signed into law the American Recovery and Reinvestment Act (ARRA), a $787 billion economic stimulus package aimed at helping the economy recover from the deepening worldwide recession. The act included increased federal spending for health care, infrastructure, education, various tax breaks and incentives, and direct assistance to individuals. Democrats overwhelmingly supported this measure, while only a few Senate Republicans supported the law.

The CBO (Congressional Budget Office) estimated that the ARRA would positively impact the GDP (Gross Domestic Product) and employment, with primary impact between 2009 and 2011. It projected an increase in the GDP of between 1.4 and 3.8% by late 2009, 1.1 and 3.3% by late 2010, and 0.4 and 1.3% by late 2011, as well as a decrease of between zero and 0.2% beyond 2014. The impact to employment would be an increase of 0.8 million to 2.3 million by last-2009, an increase of 1.2 million to 3.6 million by late 2010, an increase of 0.6 million to 1.9 million by late 2011, and declining increases in subsequent years.

References